Alfonso Elías Serrano (born 17 August 1960) is a Mexican politician affiliated with the Institutional Revolutionary Party (PRI). He served as Senator of the LX and LXI Legislatures of the Mexican Congress representing Sonora.

References

1960 births
Living people
Politicians from Sonora
Members of the Senate of the Republic (Mexico)
Institutional Revolutionary Party politicians
21st-century Mexican politicians
Monterrey Institute of Technology and Higher Education alumni
People from Arizpe